Muradiye Mosque may refer to:
 Muradiye Mosque, Manisa
 Muradiye Mosque, Edirne

Mosque disambiguation pages